The Canada women's national volleyball team participates in international women's volleyball competitions and friendly games.

The purpose of the Senior Women's A National Team Program is to identify, select and train a group of athletes who have potential, and demonstrated international skill and experience to represent Canada at the elite level.

Results

Summer Olympics
 Champions   Runners up   Third place   Fourth place

World Grand Prix
 Champions   Runners up   Third place   Fourth place

Nations League

World Championship
 Champions   Runners up   Third place   Fourth place

World Cup
 Champions   Runners up   Third place   Fourth place

Pan American Games
 Champions   Runners up   Third place   Fourth place

Pan American Cup
 Champions   Runners-up   Third place   Fourth place

NORCECA Championship
 Champions   Runners up   Third place   Fourth place

Current squad
The following is the current Canadian roster.

Head coach: Shannon Winzer

Former squads

1976 Summer Olympics

Regyna Armonas
Betty Baxter
Carole Bishop
Barbara Dalton
Mary Dempster
Kathy Girvan
Debbie Heeps
Anne Ireland
Connie Lebrun
Claire Lloyd
Patty Olson
Audrey Vandervelden
Head coach:Park Moo

1984 Summer Olympics

 Diane Ratnik
 Suzi Smith
 Tracy Mills
 Joyce Gamborg
 Audrey Vandervelden
 Monica Hitchcock
 Karen Moore
 Rachel Beliveau
 Lise Martin
 Caroline Cote
 Barbara Broen
 Josee Lebel
Head coach:Lorne Sawula—

1995 Pan American Games

Lisa Kachkowsky
Christine Toews
Kerri Buchberger
Tara MacIntyre
Jenny Rauh
Wanda Guenette
Josée Corbeil
Felicity Culley
Janis Kelly
Brigitte Soucy
Michelle Sawatzky
Lori Ann Mundt
Head coach:Mike Burchuk

1996 Summer Olympics

Kerri Buchberger
Josée Corbeil
Wanda Guenette
Janis Kelly
Lori Ann Mundt
Diane Ratnik
Erminia Russo
Michelle Sawatzky
Brigitte Soucy
Christine Stark
Kathy Tough
Katrina Von Sass
Head coach:Mike Burchuk

2002 World Championship

Barb Bellini
Kim Exner
Janis Kelly
Krista Kinsman
Anne-Marie Lemieux
Annie Levesque
Rae-Anne Mitchell
Miroslava Pribylova
Melissa Raymond
Joanne Ross
Jennifer Rauh
Amy Tutt
Head coach:Lorne Sawula

2003 World Grand Prix

Stephanie Wheler
Amy Tutt
Tammy Mahon
Lisa Reynolds
Anne-Marie Lemieux
Barb Bellini
Janis Kelly
Lies Verhoeff
Sarah Pavan
Melissa Raymond
Annie Levesque
Gina Schmidt
Head coach:Lorne Sawula

2007 NORCECA Championship

Shelley Chalmers
Emily Cordonier
Larissa Cundy
Tiffany Dodds
Andrea Frustaci
Stacey Gordon
Sherline Tasha Holness
Dayna Jansen
Annie Levesque
Tammy Mahon
Stephanie Penner
Tara Smart
Head coach:Naoki Miyashita

2008 Pan-American Cup

Nadine Alphonse
Emily Cordonier
Larissa Cundy
Tiffany Dodds
Janie Guimond
Sherline Tasha Holness
Dayna Jansen
Annie Levesque
Samantha Loewen
Tammy Mahon
Tonya Mokelki
Ashley Voth
Head coach:Naoki Miyashita

2009 Pan-American Cup

Nadine Alphonse
Julie Young
Larissa Cundy
Tiffany Dodds
Janie Guimond
Sherline Holness
Jennifer Hinze
Sophie Schlagintweit
Colette Meek
Tammy Mahon
Tonya Mokelki
Ashley Voth
Brittney Page
Lauren O'Reilly
Head coach:Arnd Ludwig

2009 Women's NORCECA Championship

Nadine Alphonse
Julie Young
Larissa Cundy
Tiffany Dodds
Janie Guimond
Sherline Holness
Kristina Fabris
Marisa Field
Colette Meek
Tammy Mahon
Tonya Mokelki
Ashley Voth
Brittney Page
Samantha Loewen
Head coach:Arnd Ludwig

2010 Women's Pan American Cup

Nadine Alphonse
Julie Young
Carla Bradstock
Janie Guimond
Sherline Holness
Lauren O'Reilly
Marisa Field
Sarah Pavan
Tammy Mahon
Tonya Mokelki
Ashley Voth
Kyla Richey
Head coach:Arnd Ludwig

2010 FIVB World Championship

Nadine Alphonse
Julie Young
Carla Bradstock
Janie Guimond
Lauren O'Reilly
Sherline Holness
Tiffany Dodds
Marisa Field
Sarah Pavan
Tammy Mahon
Tonya Mokelki
Kyla Richey
Brittney Page
Jennifer Hinze
Head coach:Arnd Ludwig

2011 Pan American Cup

Nadine Alphonse
Claire Hanna
Carla Bradstock
Marie Pier Murray-Methot
Lauren O'Reilly
Sherline Holness
Lucy Charuk
Elizabeth Cordonier
Sarah Pavan
Tammy Mahon
Kyla Richey
Brittney Page
Head coach:Arnd Ludwig

2011 NORCECA Championship

Claire Hanna
Julie Young
Carla Bradstock
Lauren O'Reilly
Sherline Holness
Marisa Field
Elizabeth Cordonier
Sarah Pavan
Tammy Mahon
Kyla Richey
Brittney Page
Jennifer Hinze
Head coach:Arnd Ludwig

2011 Pan American Games

Claire Hanna
Julie Young
Carla Bradstock
Lauren O'Reilly
Sherline Holness
Tricia Mayba
Elizabeth Cordonier
Colette Meek
Tammy Mahon
Kyla Richey
Brittney Page
Jennifer Hinze
Head coach:Arnd Ludwig

2012 Pan American Cup

Janie Guimond
Shanice Marcelle
Jaclyn Ellis
Kelci French
Jennifer Cross
Rebecca Pavan
Lisa Barclay
Marie-Pier Murray-Methot
Jaimie Thibeault
Alicia Perrin
Brittney Page
Sarah Pavan
Head coach:Arnd Ludwig

2019 Pan American Games

Tesca Andrew-Wasylik
Marisa Field
Kyla Richey
Danielle Smith
Jennifer Lundqvist
Brittney Page
Dana Cranston
Lisa Barclay
Shanice Marcelle
Lucy Charuk
Tabitha Love
Jaimie Thibeault
Head coach:Shannon Winzer

2019 FIVB Volleyball Women's Challenger Cup
Source.

Kyla Richey 
Jessica Niles
Autumn Bailey
Kiera Van Ryk 
Danielle Smith
Alicia Ogoms
Alexa Lea Gray
Andrea Mitrovic
Jennifer Cross
Shainah Joseph
Kristen Moncks 
Alicia Perrin
Megan Cyr
Emily Maglio
Head coach:Thomas Black

2019 NORCECA Championship

Jessie Niles
Kiera Van Ryk
Kyla Richey
 Danielle Smith
Alicia Ogoms
Alexa Gray
Jennifer Cross
Brie King
Hilary Howe
Shainah Joseph
Kristen Moncks
Marie-Alex Bélanger
Alicia Perrin
Emily Magilo
Head coach:Ben Josephson

2021 FIVB Nations League

 Parker Austin 
 Cassandra Bujan
 Jennifer Cross
 Alexa Gray
 Hilary Howe
 Shainah Joseph
 Brie King
 Caroline Livingston
 Alicia Ogoms
 Emily Maglio
 Andrea Mitrović
 Kim Robitaille
 Danielle Smith
 Kennedy Snape
 Layne Van Buskirk
 Kiera Van Ryk
 Jazmine Ruth White
Head coach Shannon Winzer

2021 NORCECA Championship

 Cassandra Bujan
 Natasha Calkins
 Jennifer Cross
 Hilary Howe
 Brie King
 Caroline Livingston
 Alicia Ogoms
 Andrea Mitrović
 Julia Murmann
 Kim Robitaille
 Vicky Savard
 Layne Van Buskirk
 Kiera Van Ryk
 Jazmine Ruth White
Head coach Shannon Winzer

See also

 Canada men's national volleyball team
Canada men's junior national volleyball team

References

External links
Official website
FIVB profile
Profile at 2018 World Cup

Volleyball
National women's volleyball teams
Volleyball in Canada